Terminalia microcarpa is a tree species in the family Combretaceae. It occurs throughout the Philippines, in parts of Malaysia and Indonesia (Java, Sulawesi, Borneo, Timor, and the Maluku Islands), Papua New Guinea, possibly the Bismarck Archipelago, and northern Australia. It is cultivated on a small scale in the Philippines, where the edible sweet and tart plum-like fruits are eaten as is or are traditionally made into jams, jellies, and wines.

The species was formally described in 1834 by French botanist Joseph Decaisne. In the Australian Plant Census, Terminalia sericocarpa F.Muell. is regarded as a synonym of this species. Common names in Australia include bandicoot, sovereignwood, damson and damson plum. It is known as kalumpit in the Philippines.

It blooms between September and October producing cream flowers.

It is found around springs and creeks and in rocky creek beds in the Kimberley region of Western Australia and extending across the top end of the Northern Territory and tropical areas of Queensland growing in sandy-loam-clay soils.

See also
 Damson

References

microcarpa
Trees of Malesia
Trees of New Guinea
Flora of the Northern Territory
Flora of Queensland
Rosids of Western Australia
Plants described in 1834
Taxa named by Joseph Decaisne